Peter Hillgren (born 15 March 1966) is a Swedish former footballer who played as a forward.

References

Association football forwards
Swedish footballers
Allsvenskan players
Malmö FF players
1966 births
Living people